Albert Christiaan Wilhelm Beerman (29 January 1901 – 26 November 1967) was a Dutch politician.

Beerman was born in Amsterdam He became a barrister and a member of the municipal council of Rotterdam.  He was Minister of Justice for the CHU in the De Quay cabinet from 1959 to 1963. He died in Rotterdam, aged 66.

References

  Parlement.com biography

1901 births
1967 deaths
Christian Historical Union politicians
20th-century Dutch politicians
Leiden University alumni
Ministers of Justice of the Netherlands
Municipal councillors of Rotterdam
Officers of the Order of Orange-Nassau
Politicians from Amsterdam